The following lists events that happened during 1973 in North Vietnam.

Events

January
 January 15 - Citing progress in peace negotiations, U.S. President Richard Nixon announces the suspension of offensive action in North Vietnam.

References

 
Years of the 20th century in North Vietnam
1970s in North Vietnam
North Vietnam
North
North Vietnam